Amina Aït Hammou (born 18 July 1978 in Kenitra) is a Moroccan runner who specializes in the 800 metres. Her personal best time is 1:57.82 minutes, achieved in July 2003 in Rome.

She received a year-long ban from competition in 2008 after missing three tests.

Achievements

See also
 List of doping cases in athletics

References

External links
 

1978 births
Living people
Doping cases in athletics
Moroccan female middle-distance runners
Athletes (track and field) at the 2000 Summer Olympics
Athletes (track and field) at the 2004 Summer Olympics
Olympic athletes of Morocco
Moroccan sportspeople in doping cases
People from Kenitra
Athletes (track and field) at the 2001 Mediterranean Games
Mediterranean Games competitors for Morocco
20th-century Moroccan women
21st-century Moroccan women